The Judo competition in the 1967 Summer Universiade were held in Tokyo, Japan.

Medal overview

Events

Medals table

External links
 

1967 Summer Universiade
Universiade
1967
Universiade 1976